Terreiro do Paço station is part of the Blue Line of the Lisbon Metro.

History
Opened on December 19, 2007, in conjunction with the Santa Apolónia station, and it is located on Praça do Comércio. It takes its name (literally 'Palace Square') from the adjacent Terreiro do Paço square.

The architectural design of station is by Artur Rosa.
This station won both the Valmor and Municipal Architecture prizes in 2008

Connections

Urban buses

Carris 
 15E Praça da Figueira ⇄ Algés
 25E Campo de Ourique ⇄ Praça da Figueira
 206 Cais do Sodré ⇄ Bairro Padre Cruz (morning service)
 207 Cais do Sodré ⇄ Fetais (morning service)
 208 Cais do Sodré ⇄ Estação Oriente (Interface) (morning service)
 210 Cais do Sodré ⇄ Prior Velho (morning service)
 711 Terreiro do Paço ⇄ Alto da Damaia
 714 Praça da Figueira ⇄ Outurela
 728 Restelo - Av. das Descobertas ⇄ Portela - Av. dos Descobrimentos
 732 Marquês de Pombal ⇄ Caselas
 735 Cais do Sodré ⇄ Hospital de Santa Maria
 736 Cais do Sodré ⇄ Odivelas (Bairro Dr. Lima Pimentel)
 760 Gomes Freire ⇄ Cemitério da Ajuda 
 774 Campo de Ourique (Prazeres) ⇄ Gomes Freire
 781 Cais do Sodré ⇄ Prior Velho
 782 Cais do Sodré ⇄ Praça José Queirós

Boat

Soflusa 
 Terreiro do Paço ⇄ Barreiro

See also
 List of Lisbon metro stations

References

External links

Blue Line (Lisbon Metro) stations
Railway stations opened in 2007